Sussex Christian School (SCS) is a private school located in Sussex, New Brunswick,  Canada. The school accepts students from pre-kindergarten through to grade 12. It was founded in 1982.   The school has a basketball team and a soccer team and is undefeated in water polo.

External links
Sussex Christian School - Canada

Private schools in New Brunswick
Schools in Kings County, New Brunswick
Christian schools in Canada